Mahunak (also Romanized as Māhūnak; also known as Māhūtak) is a village in Kuh Panj Rural District, in the Central District of Bardsir County, Kerman Province, Iran. At the 2006 census, its population was 223, in 55 families.

References 

Populated places in Bardsir County